Tales of Magic and Mystery is a 1985 anthology of 11 fairy tales from around the world that have been collected and retold by Ruth Manning-Sanders. It is one in a long series of such anthologies by Manning-Sanders.

Table of contents
Foreword
1. The Water Nick and the Bear (Denmark)
2. Tell Me Your Dream (Russia)
4. The Stork (Bulgaria)
5. The Eggshell (Gipsy)
6. The Three Pinks (Spain)
7. The Old Man and the Lambkin (Greek Islands)
8. Cow Crumpie (Bulgaria)
9. Ookah's Bagpipe (Estonia)
10. The Black Dort (Schleswig-Holstein)
11. The Conceited Dragon (North American Indian)
Note from last page: "For permission to retell The Old Man and the Lambkin the author and publishers wish to thank Eric Roth-Verlag, publishers of Die Reise im Goldenen Schiff."

See also
Dragon
List of dragons in mythology and folklore
List of dragons in literature
Magic (paranormal)
Witchcraft
Wizard (fantasy)

Collections of fairy tales
Children's short story collections
1985 short story collections
Methuen Publishing books
1985 children's books
1985 anthologies